Namita Kumari Chaudhary is a Nepali politician and a member of the House of Representatives of the federal parliament of Nepal. She was elected under the proportional representation system from Nepali Congress. She is a member of the House Education and Health Committee. She is also a member of the parliamentary party executive committee of Nepali Congress. She is a member of the Ministry of Education, Science and Technology in the shadow cabinet of Nepali Congress.

References

Living people
21st-century Nepalese women politicians
21st-century Nepalese politicians
Place of birth missing (living people)
Nepali Congress politicians from Madhesh Province
Nepal MPs 2017–2022
1978 births